Abdallah Abbas Al-Iryani (Arabic: عبدالله عباس الإرياني) is a Yemeni novelist and writer. He studied at Cairo University, obtaining a degree in civil engineering in 1984. He has devoted himself more seriously to literature since 2005. He has published several novels and short story collections as well as a play. His work has been translated into Italian and was included in a 2009 anthology on Yemeni literature called Perle Dello Yemen.

Works
 Bi-dūn malal : riwāyah (2006), novel
 al-Ṣuʻūd ilá Nāfiʻ : riwāyah (2007), novel
 Al-ghurm (2008), novel
 Dijlat al-shahīd : masraḥīyah (2007), play
 Ḥikāyah kull khamīs : qiṣaṣ (2006), short stories
 al-Zāriqah : qiṣaṣ qaṣīrah (2007), short stories
 Saydat al-nahraen (2008), play
 Sayf al-ʻuqdah, sayf al-ḥall : masraḥīyah (2009), play
 Māʼat ʻām min al-fawḍá : riwāyah (2009), novel
 Ḥadīth kulla yawm : qiṣaṣ (2011), short stories

References

Living people
Yemeni novelists
Yemeni writers
Year of birth missing (living people)